The Suzuki RM85 is a Motocross bike created and manufactured by Suzuki.
It has been produced from 2002–2022, It has a maximum speed of 55–60 miles per hour (88-96 kilometers per hour). The RM85L is the big wheel version of the RM85. In the 85cc class, the RM85 has the least horsepower, around 22 HP. (The Husky has the most with about 25) The RM85 is known for its bottom to mid power, and turning ability. It is best suited for kids 9–13, or 4' 10" to 5' 4", but the big wheel can be used by larger riders.

See also
 Suzuki RM series

Notes
 Suzuki Website

RM85
Off-road motorcycles
Two-stroke motorcycles